The 2000–01 West Midlands (Regional) League season was the 101st in the history of the West Midlands (Regional) League, an English association football competition for semi-professional and amateur teams based in the West Midlands county, Shropshire, Herefordshire, Worcestershire and southern Staffordshire.

Premier Division

The Premier Division featured 20 clubs which competed in the division last season, along with three new clubs:
Bromyard Town, promoted from Division One South
Shawbury United, promoted from Division One North
Wellington, promoted from Division One South

Also, Smethwick Rangers changed name to Warley Rangers.

League table

References

External links

2000–01
9